Gamna–Favre bodies are large, intracytoplasmic basophilic inclusion bodies seen in endothelial cells in patients with lymphogranuloma venereum.

They are named after Carlos Gamna and Maurice Favre.

References

External links 

Histology